Imre Lengyel (born 24 April 1977) is a Hungarian former diver who competed in the 1996 Summer Olympics and in the 2000 Summer Olympics. Studied at University of Miami 1998 – 2003 and was a Cirque du Soleil performer.

References

1948 births
Living people
Hungarian male divers
Cirque du Soleil performers
Olympic divers of Hungary
Divers at the 1996 Summer Olympics
Divers at the 2000 Summer Olympics
Universiade medalists in diving
Universiade gold medalists for Hungary
Medalists at the 1997 Summer Universiade
Medalists at the 2001 Summer Universiade
20th-century Hungarian people
21st-century Hungarian people